Fontem is one the three subdivisions (districts) of Lebialem division located in the South West Region of Cameroon. It is west of Dschang. It is made up of three Fondoms, namely Lebang, Essoh Attah, and Njoagwi (Fotabong III). It has as sub divisional headquarters Menji, which is also the division headquarters of Lebialem division.

Culture
Fontem and the surrounding areas are the home of the Bangwa people(one of the Bamileke tribes).

Medicine

It is the site of Mary Health of Africa mission hospital. Mary Health of Africa hospital is a 120-bed hospital that also has an extensive outpatient service and runs a dispensary in nearby Fonjumetaw. It specialises in treating infectious tropical conditions especially malaria, sleeping sickness, TB, typhoid fever and HIV.

Education
Fontem is home to several primary and secondary schools.
Government Bilingual High School (GBHS), Fontem
Our Lady Seat of Wisdom College

References

Populated places in Cameroon